Busti Mill, also known as the Old Mill, is a historic grist mill located at Busti in Chautauqua County, New York, USA. It was built in 1839 and remained in operation until around 1959 or 1960. In the later years, the mill was rented out and used sporadically, and the exact closing date is undetermined. The town of Busti deeded the mill to the Busti Historical Society on December 29, 1972.

It was listed on the National Register of Historic Places in 1976.

The mill is part of the Busti Grist Mill & Historical Society Museum, and is open for the town's annual apple festival and by appointment.

References

Further reading
Carlson, Norman. "Heman Bush and His Busti Mill", The Chautauqua Genealogist, 12(3) (May 1989): 1–3. Print.

Grinding mills on the National Register of Historic Places in New York (state)
Industrial buildings completed in 1881
Buildings and structures in Chautauqua County, New York
Museums in Chautauqua County, New York
Mill museums in New York (state)
History museums in New York (state)
Grinding mills in New York (state)
National Register of Historic Places in Chautauqua County, New York
1881 establishments in New York (state)